Asay is an abandoned town located in Garfield County, Utah.  It started as a farming community in the late 19th century, but the high altitude climate produced low crop yields thereby, making the lands unworkable.  A cabin and some farm structures still stand, but it sits on private land and not easily accessible.

External links

Ghost towns in Utah
Ghost towns in Garfield County, Utah